Anna Lee Waldo (born February 16, 1925) is an American historical fiction author. She is most noted for her novel Sacajawea.

Biography 
Anna Lee Waldo was born February 16, 1925, in Great Falls, Montana, and grew up in Whitefish. She claims her interest in the subject of Native Americans began as a child when she collected spear points on the shores of Whitefish Lake in Montana and listened to stories of Blackfeet and Crow grandmothers. Growing up though, she was interested and had a talent for science; graduating from Montana State University majoring in Chemistry. She attended the University of Maryland gaining a master's degree in organic chemistry, where she also met her future husband, Willis H. Waldo, a fellow chemist. They had five children together. Prior to her first novel, Sacajawea, she taught at the University of Dayton in Ohio. She has also taught chemistry at California Polytechnic State University in San Luis Obispo, California.

It took Waldo ten years to write and research Sacajawea, a 1300+ page book, finally publishing it in 1978. This led to her second novel, Prairie, and finally to her Druid Circle series about a Welsh prince and his travel to North America in the 12th Century.

Literary works

References

External links

1925 births
Living people
People from Great Falls, Montana
Montana State University alumni
University of Maryland, College Park alumni
University of Dayton faculty
American women chemists
20th-century American novelists
21st-century American novelists
American women novelists
American historical novelists
20th-century American women writers
21st-century American women writers
Women historical novelists
People from Whitefish, Montana
Novelists from Ohio
American women academics